Emotion (EMOTION 伝説の午後 いつか見たドラキュラ Hepburn: Emotion: densetsu no gogo = itsukamita Dracula), stylized on-screen as Émotion, is a 1966 Japanese experimental short film directed by Nobuhiko Obayashi. It stars Emi Tabata as Emi, a young woman who travels from a seaside village to a city, where she meets another girl named Sari (Sari Akasaka) and encounters a vampire.

Cast

Reception
In 2015, David Cairns of Notebook referred to Emotion as "a collage of camera effects, stills, pixillation and every other trick the decade had to offer", concluding: "Obayashi's caffeinated take on avant-garde cinema certainly shows the influence of commercials, and he never met a gimmick he didn't like, but he can sure compose a shot."

Home media
On 26 October 2010, the Criterion Collection released Obayashi's 1977 feature-length film House on Blu-ray and DVD, with Emotion included as a special feature.

References

External links
 

1966 films
1966 short films
Japanese short films
Films directed by Nobuhiko Obayashi
Lesbian-related films
Japanese vampire films
1960s Japanese films